Aelurillus leipoldae is a species of jumping spider that lives on the island of Crete in Greece.

References

External links
 https://web.archive.org/web/20170315000800/http://www.jumping-spiders.com/index_wiki.php?id=4988

Salticidae
Spiders of Europe
Spiders described in 1999